The Religious Coalition for Reproductive Choice (RCRC) is an abortion rights organization founded in 1973  by clergy and lay leaders from mainline denominations and faith traditions to create an interfaith organization following Roe v. Wade, the 1973 U.S. Supreme Court decision legalizing abortion in the U.S. In 1993, the original name – the Religious Coalition for Abortion Rights (RCAR) – was changed to the Religious Coalition for Reproductive Choice.

Leadership 
President and CEO: The Reverend Harry F. Knox
Chair of the Board: The Reverend Dr. Alethea Smith-Withers, Pastor of the Pavilion of God (Baptist), Washington, DC
Chair of the Coalition Council, Kate Lannamann, J.D.

State affiliates
The state affiliates and state networks of the Religious Coalition are involved in advocacy, education, community service, and implementing RCRC programs such as Clergy for Choice, All Options Clergy Counseling, and Spiritual Youth for Reproductive Freedom at the community and state level.
California
Colorado
Connecticut
Illinois
Indiana
Kentucky
Minnesota
New Mexico
Ohio
Oklahoma
Wisconsin

Member organizations  
Coalition Council Members:

Rabbinical Assembly
United Synagogue of Conservative Judaism
Union for Reform Judaism
Women's League for Conservative Judaism
Episcopal Church (United States)
American Ethical Union National Service Conference
Society for Humanistic Judaism
Presbyterians Affirming Reproductive Options (PARO) of the Presbyterian Church (USA)
Jewish Reconstructionist Federation
Reconstructionist Rabbinical Association
Central Conference of American Rabbis
North American Federation of Temple Youth
Women of Reform Judaism, The Federation of Temple Sisterhoods
Women's Rabbinic Network of Central Conference of American Rabbis
The United Church of Christ
Unitarian Universalist Association
Unitarian Universalist Women's Federation website
Young Religious Unitarian Universalists
Continental Unitarian Universalist Young Adult Network
American Jewish Committee
American Jewish Congress
Anti-Defamation League
Catholics for Choice
Christian Lesbians Out (CLOUT)
Church of the Brethren Women's Caucus
Disciples for Choice
Episcopal Urban Caucus
Episcopal Women's Caucus
Hadassah, WZOA
Jewish Women International
Lutheran Women's Caucus
Methodist Federation for Social Action
NA'AMAT USA
National Council of Jewish Women
Women's American ORT
YWCA of the USA

Reception 
RCRC is criticized as advancing a "theology of choice" in Holy Abortion, a 2003 book co-authored by United Methodist Michael J. Gorman, a professor at St. Mary's Seminary & University in Baltimore, Maryland.

See also
Evangelical and Ecumenical Women's Caucus
List of abortion-rights organizations in the United States

References

External links

Religious organizations based in Washington, D.C.
Civic and political organizations of the United States
Abortion-rights organizations in the United States
Abortion-rights religious organizations
Religious organizations established in 1973
1973 establishments in Washington, D.C.